George Bennett, Bennette, or Bennet may refer to:

Politics and law
George Bennett (Ontario politician) (1888–1948), Canadian politician, mayor of Windsor
George Bennett (Wisconsin politician) (1810–1888), Wisconsin state senator
George C. Bennett (Irish politician) (1877–1963), Irish Fine Gael politician, represented Limerick
George C. Bennett (New York politician), (1824–1885), American newspaper publisher and New York State assemblyman
George Henry Bennett (1850–1908), Scottish-born Australian brewer and politician

Religion
George Bennett (bishop) (1875–1946), Roman Catholic Bishop of Aberdeen
George John Bennett (organist) (1863–1930), English cathedral organist and composer
George Bennet (hebraist) (1750–1835), Scottish presbyterian minister and Hebraist
George Bennet (missionary) (1774–1841), English-born Christian missionary to India and Far-East countries

Sports
George Bennett (Australian cricketer) (1906–1983), Australian cricketer
George Bennett (Australian rules footballer) (1911–1974), Australian professional football player
George Bennett (cricketer, born 1829) (1829–1886), English cricketer
George Bennett (cricketer, born 1832) (1832–1913), English cricketer
George Bennett (cricketer, born 1883) (1883–1966), English cricketer, British Army officer and solicitor
George Bennett (cyclist) (born 1990), New Zealand road cyclist
George Bennett (rugby) (1913–1970), Welsh rugby union and rugby league player
George Bennet (pastoralist) (1870–1928), Australian pastoralist and racehorse owner
George Bennette (1901–1984), American baseball player

Others
George Bennett (admiral) (1926–1996), Australian admiral
George Bennett (murderer) (died 1880), Canadian who was executed for the murder of George Brown
George Bennett (naturalist) (1804–1893), English-born Australian physician and naturalist
George Bennett (probability theory), (fl. 1962) proved Bennett's inequality in probability theory
George Augustus Bennett (1807–1845), English military engineer
George John Bennett (1800–1879), English Shakespearean actor
George Bennet, 1st Baronet (died  1700), of the Bennet baronets
George Bennet, 7th Earl of Tankerville (1852–1931), British peer, cowpuncher, circus clown, and revival meeting singer

Other uses
George Bennett House, historic house near Harrison, Ohio

See also
Bennett (disambiguation)